Euphione is a genus of polychaetes belonging to the family Polynoidae.

The species of this genus are found in Australia, Malesia and Southern Africa.

Species:

Euphione branchifera 
Euphione chitoniformis 
Euphione elisabethae 
Euphione ornata 
Euphione squamosa 
Euphione suluensis

References

Annelids